Frank Maguire may refer to:

 Frank Maguire (politician) (1929–1981), Irish politician, Independent MP for Fermanagh & South Tyrone
 Frank Maguire (solicitor) (1955–2011), Scottish solicitor and campaigner for victims of injustice